The Movement for United Right (Movimento per le Destre Unite), since 2020 also known as New United Italy (Nuova Italia Unita),  is a small political party in Italy.

History
The movement was born in 2014 on the occasion of the Piedmontese regional election, as the Movement for National Alliance, a federation of The Right, the Social Right, Future and Freedom and I the South. In that competition United Right took the 0.25% of the vote and it didn't elect any regional councillor. The political activity of the movement was then continued by its leader Massimiliano Panero, a former member of Tricolour Flame.

In the 2018 general election United Right made an alliance with the movement of Pitchforks and it ran only in some regions for the Senate, getting only 6,229 preferences and the 0.02% of the vote.

In 2019, on the occasion of the European Parliament election, United Right made an alliance with CasaPound. The list is exempt from the presentation of the collection of signatures as it is a member of the AENM, represented in the European Parliament by the Hungarian MEP Bela Kovacs.

Electoral Results

European Parliament

References

External links
Official website

2014 establishments in Italy
Political parties established in 2014
Far-right politics in Italy
Nationalist parties in Italy
Right-wing populist parties